7700 series may refer to:

 Toei 7700 series
 Tokyu 7700 series